"Marconi Award" links here. Note that in the Netherlands, the radio academy awards are also called Marconi Awards.

The Marconi Radio Awards are presented annually by the National Association of Broadcasters (NAB) to the top radio stations and on-air personalities in the United States. The awards are named in honor of Guglielmo Marconi, the man generally credited as the "father of wireless telegraphy". NAB member stations submit nominations.  A task force determines the finalists and the Marconi Radio Award Selection Academy votes on the winners, who receive their awards in the fall.

Marconi Radio Awards for 2018

Legendary Station
KKBQ-FM Houston, TX

Network/Syndicated Personality of the Year
Dan Patrick, Premiere Networks

Station of the Year by market size
Major Market: WSB-AM Atlanta, GA
Large Market: WDBO-FM Orlando, FL
Medium Market: KSRO-AM Santa Rosa, CA
Small Market: WWUS-FM Sugarloaf Key, FL

Personality of the Year by market size
Major Market: Angie Martinez, WWPR-FM, New York, NY
Large Market: Joe Kelley, WDBO-FM, Orlando, FL
Medium Market: Pat Kerrigan, KSRO-AM, Santa Rosa, CA
Small Market: Brian Byers, WSOY-AM, Decatur, IL

Station of the Year by format
Adult Contemporary (AC): KSTP-FM St. Paul, MN
Classic Hits: KRTH-FM Los Angeles, CA
Contemporary Hit Radio (CHR): KNDE-FM College Station, TX
Country: KCLR-FM Columbia, MO
News/Talk: WTOP-FM Washington, D.C.
Non-Commercial: WPSC-FM Wayne, NJ
Religious: KLTY-FM Dallas, TX
Rock: WMMR-FM Philadelphia, PA
Small Market: WWUS-FM Sugarloaf Key, FL
Spanish: WKAQ-AM San Juan, P.R.
Sports: WEEI-FM Boston, MA
Urban: WWPR-FM New York, NY

Marconi Radio Awards for 2017

Legendary Station
WCBS-AM New York, NY

Network/Syndicated Personality of the Year
Rickey Smiley, Reach Media Inc.

Station of the Year by market size
Major Market: WTOP-FM Washington, D.C.
Large Market: WKRQ-FM Cincinnati, OH
Medium Market: KRMG-FM Tulsa, OK
Small Market: KNDE-FM College Station, TX

Personality of the Year by market size
Major Market: Funkmaster Flex, WQHT-FM, New York, NY
Large Market: Linda Lee, WYCD-FM, Detroit, MI
Medium Market: Steve McIntosh & Ted Woodward, KNSS-FM, Wichita, KS
Small Market: Ken Thomas, WJJY-FM, Brainerd, MN

Station of the Year by format
Adult Contemporary (AC): WBEB-FM Philadelphia, PA
Classic Hits: WPBG-FM Peoria, IL
Contemporary Hit Radio (CHR): KRBE-FM Houston, TX
Country: KPLX-FM Dallas, TX
News/Talk: WDBO-FM Orlando, FL
Non-Commercial: WRHU-FM Hempstead, NY
Religious: WLIB-AM New York, NY
Rock: KSHE-FM St. Louis, MO
Small Market: KNDE-FM College Station, TX
Sports: KTCK-FM Dallas, TX
Urban: WHQT-FM Miami, FL

Marconi Radio Awards for 2016

Legendary Station
WINS-AM New York, NY

Network/Syndicated Personality of the Year
Delilah, Premiere Networks

Station of the Year by market size
Major Market: WBEB-FM Philadelphia, PA
Large Market: WBAL-AM Baltimore, MD
Medium Market: WHKO-FM Dayton, OH
Small Market: WKDZ-FM Cadiz, KY

Personality of the Year by market size
Major Market: Toucher & Rich, WBZ-FM Boston, MA
Large Market: Brooke & Jubal, KQMV-FM Seattle, WA
Medium Market: Chaz & AJ, WPLR-FM Milford, CT
Small Market: Brent Carl Fleshman, WHUB-FM Cookeville, TN

Station of the Year by format
Adult Contemporary (AC): WLEN-FM Adrian, MI
Contemporary Hit Radio (CHR): KTXY-FM Columbia, MO
Country: KKBQ-FM Houston, TX
News/Talk: WTOP-FM Washington, D.C.
Classic Hits: KRTH-FM Los Angeles, CA
Religious: KLTY-FM Dallas, TX
Rock: KCMQ-FM Columbia, MO
Spanish: KLOL-FM Houston, TX
Sports: WXYT-FM Detroit, MI
Urban: WHUR-FM Washington, D.C.
Non-Commercial: WSOU-FM South Orange, NJ

Marconi Radio Awards for 2015

Legendary Station
KYW-AM Philadelphia, PA

Network/Syndicated Personality of the Year
Steve Harvey, Premiere Radio Networks

Station of the Year by market size
Major Market: WTOP-FM Washington, D.C.
Large Market: KSTP-FM St Paul, MN
Medium Market: KRMG-AM Tulsa, OK
Small Market: WLEN-FM Adrian, MI

Personality of the Year by market size
Major Market: Eric & Kathy, WTMX-FM Chicago, IL
Large Market: Gene & Julie Gates, WRAL-FM Raleigh, NC
Medium Market: Dan Potter, KRMG-AM Tulsa, OK
Small Market: Brian Byers, WSOY-AM Decatur, IL

Station of the Year by format
Adult Contemporary (AC): WDUV-FM Tampa, FL
Contemporary Hit Radio (CHR): KQMV-FM Seattle, WA
Country: WUBE-FM Cincinnati, OH
News/Talk: WSB-AM Atlanta, GA
Classic Hits: KONO-FM San Antonio, TX
Religious: WPRS-FM Washington, D.C.
Rock: WDRV-FM Chicago, IL
Sports: WFAN-AM New York, NY
Urban: WBLS-FM New York, NY
Non-Commercial: WKAR-FM East Lansing, MI

Marconi Radio Awards for 2014

Legendary Station
WFAN-FM New York, NY

Network/Syndicated Personality of the Year
Rush Limbaugh, Premiere Radio Networks

Station of the Year by market size
Major Market: KKBQ-FM Houston, TX
Large Market: WTMJ-AM Milwaukee, WI
Medium Market: WOWO-AM Fort Wayne, IN
Small Market: KFGO Fargo, ND

Personality of the Year by market size
Major Market: Kevin and Bean, KROQ-FM Los Angeles, CA
Large Market: Ryan and Shannon, KSTP-FM St. Paul, MN
Medium Market: Kevin Miller, KIDO-AM Boise, ID
Small Market: Dottie Ray, KXIC-AM Iowa City, IA

Station of the Year by format
Adult Contemporary (AC): WBEB-FM Philadelphia, PA
Contemporary Hit Radio (CHR): KQKS-FM Denver, CO
Country: KCYY-FM San Antonio, TX
News/Talk: WLW-AM Cincinnati, OH
Oldies: WOGL-FM Philadelphia, PA
Religious: KLTY-FM Dallas, TX
Rock: KROQ-FM Los Angeles, CA
Spanish: KLZT-FM Austin, TX
Sports: WBZ-FM Boston, MA
Urban: WHQT-FM Coral Gables, FL
Non-Commercial: WRHU-FM Long Island, NY

Marconi Radio Awards for 2013

Legendary Station
WBBM-AM Chicago, IL

Network/Syndicated Personality of the Year
Steve Harvey, Premiere Radio Networks

Station of the Year by market size
Major Market: WBEB-FM Philadelphia, PA
Large Market: KSTP-FM St. Paul, MN
Medium Market: KRMG-FM Tulsa, OK
Small Market: WKDZ-FM Cadiz, KY

Personality of the Year by market size
Major Market: Eric & Kathy, WTMX-FM Chicago, IL
Large Market: Cornbread, WIL-FM St. Louis, MO
Medium Market: Brian Byers, WSOY-AM Decatur, IL
Small Market: Monk & Kelly, WGSQ-AM Cookeville, TN

Spanish Format Personality of the Year
Javier Romero, WAMR-FM Miami, FL

Station of the Year by format
Adult Contemporary (AC): WTMX-FM Chicago, IL
Contemporary Hit Radio (CHR): WRDW-FM Philadelphia, PA
Country: KKBQ-FM Houston, TX
News/Talk: WBZ-AM Boston, MA
Religious: KLRC-FM Siloam Springs, AR
Rock: WZLX-FM Boston, MA
Spanish: KLOL-FM Houston, TX
Sports: KTCK-FM Dallas, TX
Urban: WVEE-FM Atlanta, GA

Marconi Radio Awards for 2012

Legendary Station
KSTP-FM St. Paul, MN

Network Syndicated Personality of the Year
Dan Patrick, Direct TV/Premiere Networks

Station of the Year by market size
Major: WTOP-FM Washington, DC
Large: KSON-FM San Diego, CA
Medium: WHO-AM Des Moines, IA
Small: WVAQ-FM Morgantown, WV

Personality of the Year by market size
Major: Mike Francesa, WFAN-AM New York, NY
Large: Moon and Staci, KSTP-FM St. Paul, MN
Medium: Jan Mickelson, WHO-AM Des Moines, IA
Small: Scotty and Carissa in the Morning, KCLR-FM Columbia, MO

Station of the Year by format
Adult Contemporary (AC): WBEB-FM Philadelphia, PA
Contemporary Hit Radio (CHR): KIIS-FM Los Angeles, CA
Country: WYCD-FM Detroit, MI
News/Talk/Sports: WTOP-FM Washington, DC
Oldies: WOGL-FM Philadelphia, PA
Religious: KLTY-FM Dallas, TX
Rock: KINK-FM Portland, OR
Spanish: KMVK-FM Dallas, TX
Sports: WEEI-FM Boston, MA
Urban: WBLS-FM New York, NY

Marconi Radio Awards for 2011

Legendary Station
WTOP-FM Washington, DC

Network Syndicated Personality of the Year
Ryan Seacrest, Premiere Networks

Station of the Year by market size
Major: WBEB-FM Philadelphia, PA
Large: WCCO-AM Minneapolis, MN 
Medium: WDEL Wilmington, DE
Small: WLEN-FM Adrian, MI

Personality of the Year by market size
Major: Kevin and Bean, KROQ-FM Los Angeles, CA
Large: Dave Ryan, KDWB-FM Minneapolis, MN
Medium: Van Harden and Bonnie Lucas, WHO-AM Des Moines, IA
Small: Dennis Jon Bailey and Diane Douglas, WIKY-FM, Evansville, IN
Spanish: Edgar "Shoboy" Sotelo, KMVK-FM Dallas, TX

Station of the Year by format
Adult Contemporary (AC): WMGX-FM South Portland, ME
Contemporary Hit Radio (CHR): KPWR-FM Los Angeles, CA 
Country: KYGO-FM Denver, CO
News/Talk/Sports: WSB-AM Atlanta, GA
Oldies: WOMC-FM Detroit, MI
Religious: KNOM-AM Nome, AK
Rock: WAPL-FM Green Bay, WI
Spanish: KLVE-FM Los Angeles, CA 
Sports: WBZ-FM Boston, MA
Urban: WHUR-FM Washington, DC

Marconi Radio Awards for 2010

Legendary Station
WBZ-AM Boston, MA

Network Syndicated Personality of the Year
Scott Shannon, Citadel Broadcasting

Station of the Year by market size
Major: WTOP-FM Washington, DC
Large: KSTP-FM Saint Paul, MN 
Medium: KKOB-AM Albuquerque, NM
Small: KFGO Fargo, ND

Personality of the Year by market size
Major: Ronn Owens, KGO-AM San Francisco, CA
Large: Doug Wright, KSL-AM Salt Lake City, UT
Medium: Kelly Mac, WJMZ-FM Greenville, SC
Small: Leo Greco, WMT-AM Cedar Rapids, IA
Spanish: Eddie "Piolin" Sotelo, KSCA-FM, Los Angeles, CA

Station of the Year by format
Adult Contemporary (AC): WMJX-FM Boston, MA
Contemporary Hit Radio (CHR): KIIS-FM Los Angeles, CA 
Country: WFMS Indianapolis, IN
News/Talk/Sports: WTOP-FM Washington, DC
Oldies: WCBS-FM New York, NY
Religious: WMIT-FM Black Mountain, NC
Rock: WMMR-FM Philadelphia, PA
Spanish: WOJO-FM Chicago, IL 
Sports: WFAN-AM New York, NY
Urban: WVEE-FM Atlanta, GA

Marconi Radio Awards for 2009
Hosted by Laura Ingraham, the awards show included a live performance by Brian McKnight, host of "The Brian McKnight Show" and a renowned R&B singer.

Legendary Station
KKOB (770 AM) Albuquerque, NM

Network Syndicated Personality of the Year
Dave Ramsey, The Lampo Group

Station of the Year by market size
Major: WBEB (101.1 FM) Philadelphia, PA
Large: WIBC (93.1 FM) Indianapolis, IN
Medium: WHO (1040 AM) Des Moines, IA
Small: WJBC (1230 AM) Bloomington, IL

Personality of the Year by market size
Major: Matt Siegel, WXKS-FM (107.9 FM) Boston MA
Large: Bill Cunningham, WLW (700 AM) Cincinnati, OH
Medium: Van & Bonnie, WHO (1040 AM) Des Moines, IA
Small: Lacy Neff, WVAQ (101.9 FM) Morgantown, WV

Spanish format Personality of the Year
Alberto Alegre, KSAG (720 AM) San Antonio, TX

Station of the Year by format
Adult Contemporary (AC): WBEB (101.1 FM) Philadelphia, PA
Contemporary Hit Radio (CHR): WVAQ (101.9 FM) Morgantown, WV 
Country: KYGO-FM (98.5 FM) Denver, CO
News/Talk/Sports: WGN (720 AM) Chicago, IL
Oldies: WMXJ (102.7 FM) Miami, FL
Religious: KLTY (94.9 FM) Dallas, TX
Rock: KQRS-FM (92.5 FM) Minneapolis, MN
Spanish: KLVE (107.5 FM) Los Angeles, CA 
Sports: WGR (550 AM) Buffalo, NY
Urban: WJMZ-FM (107.3 FM) Greenville, SC

Marconi Radio Awards for 2008
Hosted by Billy Bush.

Legendary Station
WSM-AM, Nashville, TN

Network Syndicated Personality of the Year
Glenn Beck, Premiere Radio Networks

Station of the Year by market size
Major: WMAL, Washington, DC
Large: KOA-AM, Denver, CO
Medium: WLAV-FM, Grand Rapids, MI
Small: WGIL-AM, Galesburg, IL

Personality of the Year by market size
Major: Ryan Seacrest, KIIS-FM Los Angeles, CA
Large: Kelly, Mudflap & JoJo Turnbeaugh, KYGO-FM Denver, CO
Medium: Tony Gates, WLAV-FM Grand Rapids, MI
Small: George & Katie, WAXX-FM Eau Claire, WI

Spanish format Personality of the Year
Eddie "Piolín" Sotelo, KSCA-FM Los Angeles, CA

Station of the Year by format
Adult Contemporary (AC): WTMX-FM, Chicago, IL
Contemporary Hit Radio (CHR): KHKS-FM, Dallas, TX 
Country: WFMS-FM, Indianapolis, IN
News/Talk/Sports: KFI-AM, Los Angeles, CA
Oldies: KQQL-FM, Minneapolis, MN
Religious: WMIT-FM, Black Mountain, NC
Rock: WAPL-FM Appleton, WI
Spanish: KSCA-FM, Los Angeles, CA
Sports: WEEI-AM Boston, MA
Urban: WBLS-FM New York, NY

Marconi Radio Awards for 2007
Hosted by Glenn Beck.

Legendary Station
WWL-AM, New Orleans, LA

Network Syndicated Personality of the Year
Sean Hannity, ABC Radio Networks

Station of the Year by market size
Major: WGN-AM, Chicago, IL
Large: KSTP-FM, Minneapolis, MN
Medium: WWL-AM, New Orleans, LA
Small: WAXX-FM, Eau Claire, WI

Personality of the Year by market size
Major: Big Boy, KPWR-FM, Los Angeles, CA
Large: Chuck Collier, WGAR-FM, Cleveland, OH
Medium: Van & Bonnie, WHO-AM, Des Moines, IA
Small: Mike McNamara, KNOX-AM, Grand Forks, ND

Station of the Year by format
Adult Contemporary (AC): WBEB-FM, Philadelphia, PA
Contemporary Hit Radio (CHR): WVAQ-FM, Morgantown, WV
Country: WIVK-FM, Knoxville, TN
News/Talk/Sports: WWL-AM, New Orleans, LA
Oldies: WWSW-FM, Pittsburgh, PA
Religious: KLTY-FM, Dallas, TX
Rock: WMMR-FM, Philadelphia, PA
Spanish: KLVE-FM, Los Angeles, CA
Sports: KTCK-AM, Dallas, TX
Urban: WHUR-FM, Washington, DC

Marconi Radio Awards for 2006

Legendary Station
WBEB-FM, Philadelphia, Pennsylvania

Network Syndicated Personality of the Year
The Bob & Tom Show, Premiere Radio Networks

Station of the Year by market size
Major: KGO-AM, San Francisco, California
Large: WEEI-AM, Boston, Massachusetts
Medium: WIVK-FM, Knoxville, Tennessee
Small: KGMI-AM, Bellingham, Washington

Personality of the Year by market size
Major: Scott Slade, WSB-AM, Atlanta, Georgia
Large: Tom Barnard, KQRS-FM, Minneapolis, Minnesota
Medium: Brent Johnson, WTCB-FM, Columbia, South Carolina
Small: Lacy Neff, WVAQ-FM, Morgantown, West Virginia

Station of the Year by format
Adult Contemporary (AC): KOIT-FM, San Francisco, California
Contemporary Hit Radio (CHR): WSTW-FM, Wilmington, Delaware
Country: KYGO-FM, Denver, Colorado
News/Talk/Sports: KGO-AM, San Francisco, California
Oldies: WMJI-FM, Cleveland, Ohio. 
Religious: KJIL-FM, Meade, Kansas
Rock: WEBN-FM, Cincinnati, Ohio
Spanish: KSCA-FM, Los Angeles, California
Sports: WEEI-AM, Boston, Massachusetts
Urban: WGCI-FM, Chicago, Illinois

Marconi Radio Awards for 2005

Legendary Station
WIBC, Indianapolis, Indiana

Network Syndicated Personality of the Year
Rush H. Limbaugh, Premiere Radio Networks

Station of the Year by market size
Major: WTOP (AM), Washington, DC
Large: WSB-AM, Atlanta, Georgia
Medium: WDBO, Orlando, Florida
Small: WJBC, Bloomington, Illinois

Personality of the Year by market size
Major: Bill Handel, KFI-AM, Los Angeles, California
Large: Lanigan & Malone, WMJI-FM, Cleveland, Ohio
Medium: Don Weeks, WGY-AM, Albany, New York
Small: Ward Jacobson & Cathy Blythe, KFOR-AM, Lincoln, Nebraska

Station of the Year by format
Adult Contemporary (AC): WBEB-FM, Philadelphia, Pennsylvania
Adult Standards: KJUL-FM, Las Vegas, Nevada
Contemporary Hit Radio (CHR): WSTR-FM, Atlanta, Georgia
Classical: KDFC-FM, San Francisco, California
Country: WIVK-FM, Knoxville, Tennessee
NAC/Jazz: KIFM, San Diego, California
News/Talk/Sports: WIBC, Indianapolis, Indiana
Oldies: KCMO-FM, Kansas City, Missouri
Religious: KLTY-FM, Dallas, Texas
Rock: WFBQ-FM, Indianapolis, Indiana
Spanish: KLVE-FM, Los Angeles, California
Urban: WBLS-FM, New York, New York

Marconi Radio Awards for 2004

Legendary Station
 WOR New York, N.Y.

Network/Syndicated Personality of the Year
 Tom Joyner, Reach Media

Stations of the Year by Market Size
 Major: WBEB-FM Philadelphia, Pa.
 Large: KYGO-FM Denver, Colo.
 Medium: WTMJ-AM Milwaukee, Wis.
 Small: KIHR-AM Hood River, Ore.

Personality of the Year by Market Size
 Major: Big Boy KPWR-FM, Los Angeles, Calif.
 Large: Scott Slade WSB-AM, Atlanta, Ga.
 Medium: Jim Turner WDBO-AM, Orlando, Fla.
 Small: Terry Cavanaugh WGIL-AM, Galesburg, Ill.

Station of the Year by Format
 AC: WLEN-FM Adrian, Mich.
 Adult Standards: KABL-AM San Francisco, Calif.
 CHR: KPWR-FM Los Angeles, Calif.
 Classical: WGMS-FM Washington, D.C.
 Country: KYGO-FM Denver, Colo.
 NAC/Jazz: WNUA-FM Chicago, Ill.
 News/Talk/Sports: WGN-AM Chicago, Ill.
 Oldies: WMJI-FM Cleveland, Ohio
 Religious: WNNL-FM Raleigh, N.C.
 Rock: KFOG-FM San Francisco, Calif.
 Spanish: KLQV-FM San Diego, Calif.
 Urban: KPRS-FM Kansas City, Mo.

Marconi Radio Awards for 2003

Legendary Station
 WABC New York, N.Y.

Network/Syndicated Personality of the Year
 Sean Hannity, ABC Radio Networks

Stations of the Year by Market Size
 Major: KGO San Francisco, Calif.
 Large: WMJI Cleveland, Ohio
 Medium (tie): WIBC Indianapolis, Ind. and WIVK Knoxville, Tenn. 
 Small (tie): KLVI Beaumont, Texas and WCRZ Flint, Mich.

Personality of the Year by Market Size
 Major: Ronn Owens, KGO San Francisco, Calif.
 Large: Preston Westmoreland, KTAR Phoenix, Ariz.
 Medium: Greg Garrison, WIBC Indianapolis, Ind.
 Small: Jim Kerr, KNCO-AM Grass Valley, Calif.

Station of the Year by Format
 AC: KOIT San Francisco, Calif.
 CHR: WSTR Atlanta, Ga.
 Classical: KDFC San Francisco, Calif.
 Country: KPLX Dallas, Texas
 News/Talk/Sports: WTMJ Milwaukee, Wis.
 Oldies: KCMO-FM Kansas City, Mo.
 Religious: KNOM Nome, Alaska
 Rock: KQRS Minneapolis, Minn.
 Urban: WVAZ Chicago, Ill.

Marconi Radio Awards for 2002

Legendary Station
 WSB-AM Atlanta, Ga.

Network/Syndicated Personality of the Year
 Paul Harvey, "Paul Harvey News and Comment," ABC Radio Network

Stations of the Year by Market Size
 Major: WGN Chicago, Ill.
 Large: KIRO Seattle, Wash.
 Medium: WFMS Indianapolis, Ind.
 Small: WKDZ Cadiz, Ky.

Personalities of the Year by Market Size 
 Major: Big Boy, KPWR Los Angeles, Calif.
 Large: Jim Scott, WLW Cincinnati, Ohio
 Medium: Cathy Blythe, KFOR Lincoln, Neb.
 Small: Al Caldwell, KLVI Beaumont, Texas

Stations of the Year by Format
 AC: WLTW New York, N.Y. 
 Adult Standards: KABL-AM San Francisco, Calif. 
 CHR: KPWR Los Angeles, Calif.
 Country: WFMS Indianapolis, Ind.
 News/Talk/Sports: KGO San Francisco, Calif.
 Oldies: WMJI Cleveland, Ohio
 Religious: KFSH-FM Los Angeles, Calif.
 Rock: KOZT Fort Bragg, Calif.
 Spanish: KGBT-FM McAllen, Texas
 Urban: WAMO-FM Pittsburgh, Pa.

Marconi Radio Awards for 2001

Legendary Station
 KNIX Phoenix, Ariz.

Network/Syndicated Personality of the Year
 Rick Dees, Premiere Radio Networks

Stations of the Year by Market Size
 Major: KGO San Francisco, Calif.
 Large: KOGO San Diego, Calif.
 Medium: WGY Albany, N.Y.
 Small: WICO-FM Salisbury, Md.

Personalities of the Year by Market Size 
 Major: Matt Siegel, WXKS-FM Boston, Mass.
 Large: Bill Cunningham, WLW Cincinnati, Ohio
 Medium: Mark Belling, WISN Milwaukee, Wis.
 Small: Brian Scott, KTWO Casper, Wyo.

Stations of the Year by Format
 AC: WALK-FM Nassau/Suffolk, N.Y.
 Adult Standards: WMMB Melbourne, Fla.
 CHR: KIIS-FM Los Angeles, Calif.
 Classical: WGMS Washington, D.C.
 Country: KPLX Dallas, Texas
 NAC/Jazz: WNWV Cleveland, Ohio
 News/Talk/Sports: KKOB-AM Albuquerque, N.M.
 Oldies: KCMO-FM Kansas City, Mo.
 Religious: WMHK Columbia, S.C.
 Rock: WEBN Cincinnati, Ohio
 Spanish: KLNO Dallas, Texas
 Urban: KPRS Kansas City, Mo.

Marconi Radio Awards for 2000

Legendary Station
 WEBN Cincinnati, Ohio

Network Syndicated Personality of the Year
 Rush Limbaugh, "The Rush Limbaugh Show," Premiere Radio Networks

Stations of the Year by Market Size
 Major: WOMC Detroit, Mich.
 Large: KESZ Phoenix, Ariz.
 Medium: WOOD-AM Grand Rapids, Mich.
 Small: WAXX Eau Claire, Wis.

Personalities of the Year by Market Size 
 Major: Mike Francesa and Chris Russo WFAN New York, N.Y.
 Large: Jay Gilbert WEBN Cincinnati, Ohio 
 Medium: Jimmy Matis WFBQ Indianapolis, Ind. 
 Small: Tim Wilson WAXX Eau Claire, Wis.

Stations of the Year by Format
 AC: KSTP-FM Minneapolis, Minn.
 Adult Standards: KVFD, Fort Dodge, Iowa
 CHR: KDWB Minneapoli, Minn.
 Classical: WBQQ Kennebunk, Maine
 Country: WTQR Winston-Salem, N.C.
 NAC/Jazz: WJJZ Philadelphia, Pa.
 News/Talk/Sports: WTMJ Milwaukee, Wis.
 Oldies: WOMC Detroit, Mich.
 Religious: WMBI Chicago, Ill.
 Rock: WFBQ Indianapolis, Ind.
 Spanish: KLAT Houston, Texas
 Urban (tie):WUSL Philadelphia, Pa. and WVEE, Atlanta, Ga.

Marconi Radio Awards for 1999

Legendary Station
 KOA Denver, Colo.

Network/Syndicated Personality of the Year
 Bob Kevoian and Tom Griswold, "The Bob and Tom Show", AMFM Radio Networks

Stations of the Year by Market Size
 Major: KGO San Francisco, Calif.
 Large: KUDL Kansas City, Mo. 
 Medium: WFBQ Indianapolis, Ind. 
 Small: KTTS-FM Springfield, Mo.

Personalities of the Year by Market Size 
 Major: Kevin and Bean, KROQ Los Angeles, Calif.
 Large: Steve Kelley, KOA Denver, Colo.
 Medium: Scott Innes, WYNK-FM Baton Rouge, La. 
 Small: Scott Kooistra, KYNT Yankton, S.D.

Stations of the Year by Format 
 AC: KUEL Fort Dodge, Iowa
 CHR: WNNK Harrisburg, Pa. 
 Classical: KFUO-FM St. Louis, Mo.
 Country: WDAF Kansas City, Mo. 
 Oldies: WWSW Pittsburgh, Pa.
 NAC/Jazz: KZJZ St. Louis, Mo. 
 Religious/Gospel: WUGN Midland, Mich. 
 Rock: WEBN, Cincinnati Ohio
 News/Talk/Sports: WBZ Boston, Mass. 
 Spanish: KLTN Houston, Texas 
 Urban: WBLX Mobile, Ala.

Marconi Radio Awards for 1998

Legendary Station
 WCBS-FM New York, N.Y.

Network/Syndicated Personality of the Year
 Paul Harvey, ABC Radio Networks

Stations of the Year by Market Size
 Major: WBZ-AM Boston, Mass.
 Large: WMJI-FM Cleveland, Ohio
 Medium: WNNK-FM Harrisburg, Pa.
 Small: KRKT-FM Albany, Ore.

Personalities of the Year by Market Size
 Major: Kidd Kraddick, KHKS-FM Dallas, Texas
 Large: Mike Murphy, KCMO-AM Kansas City, Mo.
 Medium: Tim Burns and Sue Campbell, WNNK-FM Harrisburg, Pa.
 Small: John Murphy and George House, WAXX-FM Eau Claire, Wis.

Stations of the Year by Format
 AC (tie): KYXY-FM San Diego, CA and WLHT-FM Grand Rapids, Mich.
 Adult Standards: KVFD-AM Fort Dodge, Iowa
 CHR: KDWB-FM Minneapolis, Minn.
 Country: KFKF-FM Kansas City, Mo.
 News/Talk/Sports: WCCO-AM Minneapolis, Minn.
 Oldies: WBIG-FM Washington, D.C.
 Religious/Gospel: WCRF-FM Cleveland, Ohio
 Rock: WFBQ-FM Indianapolis, Ind.
 Spanish: KGBT-AM/FM McAllen, Texas
 Urban/R&B: WVEE-FM Atlanta, Ga.

Marconi Radio Awards for 1997

Legendary Station
 KVIL-FM Dallas, Texas

Network/Syndicated Personality of the Year
 Dr. Laura Schlessinger, Synergy Broadcasting

Stations of the Year by Market Size
 Major: WCBS-FM New York, N.Y.
 Large: WFBQ-FM Indianapolis, Ind.
 Medium: KKOB-AM Albuquerque, N.M.
 Small: KFGO Fargo, N.D.

Personalities of the Year by Market Size
 Major: Don Imus WFAN-AM, New York, N.Y.
 Large: Bob Kevoian and Tom Griswold, WFBQ-FM Indianapolis, Ind.
 Medium: Van & Bonnie, WHO-AM Des Moines, Iowa
 Small: Bill O’Brian, KRKT-FM Albany, Ore.

Stations of the Year by Format
 AC: KVIL-FM Dallas, Texas
 Adult Standards: KOGA-AM Ogallala, Neb.
 CHR: WNNK-FM Harrisburg, Pa.
 Classical: WQXR-FM New York, N.Y.
 Country: WSOC-FM Charlotte, N.C.
 NAC/Jazz: WLOQ-FM Orlando, Fla.
 News/Talk/Sports: KFGO Fargo, N.D.
 Oldies: WWSW-AM/FM Pittsburgh, Pa.
 Religious/Gospel: WMHK-FM Columbia, S.C.
 Rock: WDVE-FM Pittsburgh, Pa.
 Spanish: KLVE-FM Los Angeles, Calif.
 Urban/R&B: WVAZ-FM Chicago, Ill.

Marconi Radio Awards for 1996

Legendary Station
 WJR-AM Detroit, Mich.

Network/Syndicated Personality of the Year
 Paul Harvey, ABC Radio Networks

Stations of the Year by Market Size
 Major: WFAN-AM New York, N.Y.
 Large: WHAS-AM Louisville, Ky.
 Medium: KSSN-FM Little Rock, Ark.
 Small: WRGA-AM Rome, Ga.

Personalities of the Year by Market Size
 Major: Hudson and Harrigan, KILT-FM Houston, Texas
 Large: Coyote Calhoun, WAMZ-FM Louisville, Ky.
 Medium: Bruce Bond, WNNK-FM Harrisburg, Pa.
 Small: Michael H. McDougald WRGA-AM, Rome, Ga.

Stations of the Year by Format
 AC/EZ: WLTE-FM Minneapolis, Minn.
 Big Band/Nostalgia: WMMB-AM Melbourne, Fla.
 CHR: KDWB-FM Minneapolis, Minn.
 Classical: WGMS-FM Washington, D.C.
 Country: KMPS-AM/FM Seattle, Wash.
 Jazz: KPLU-FM Tacoma, Wash.
 News/Talk/Sports: WFAN-AM New York, N.Y.
 Oldies: WQSR-FM Baltimore, Md.
 Religious/Gospel: WMBI-FM Chicago, Ill.
 Rock: WFBQ-FM Indianapolis, Ind.
 Spanish: KLTN-FM, Houston, Texas
 Urban/R&B: WJLB-FM Detroit, Mich.

Marconi Radio Awards for 1995

Legendary Station
 KGO-AM San Francisco, Calif.

Network/Syndicated Personality of the Year
 Rush Limbaugh, EFM Media Management

Stations of the Year by Market Size
 Major: WBZ-AM Boston, Mass.
 Large: WFBQ-FM Indianapolis, Ind.
 Medium: WHO-AM Des Moines, Iowa
 Small: WHIZ-AM Zanesville, Ohio

Personalities of the Year by Market Size
 Major: Jonathon Brandmeier, WLUP-FM Chicago, Ill.
 Large: Bob Kevoian and Tom Griswold, WFBQ-FM Indianapolis, Ind.
 Medium: Jerry Carr, WMT-AM Cedar Rapids, Iowa
 Small: J. Douglas Williams and Becky Myles, KWOX-FM Woodward, Okla.

Stations of the Year by Format
 AC/EZ: KOEL-AM Oelwein, Iowa
 Big Band/Nostalgia: KEZW-AM Denver, Colo.
 CHR: WNNK-FM Harrisburg, Pa.
 Classical: WCLV-FM Cleveland, Ohio
 Country: WSIX-FM Nashville, Tenn. 
 Jazz: WNWV-FM Cleveland, Ohio
 News/Talk/Sports: WLS-AM Chicago, Ill.
 Oldies: WWSW-AM/FM, Pittsburgh, Pa.
 Religious/Gospel: KKLA-FM Los Angeles, Calif.
 Rock: KROQ-FM Los Angeles, Calif.
 Spanish: KLOK-AM San Jose, Calif.
 Urban/R&B: WVEE-FM Atlanta, Ga.

Marconi Radio Awards for 1994

Legendary Station
 KDKA-AM Pittsburgh, Pa.

Network/Syndicated Personality of the Year
 Don Imus, Westwood One Radio Networks

Stations of the Year by Market Size
 Major: WJR-AM Detroit, Mich.
 Large: WHAS-AM Louisville, Ky.
 Medium: KLBJ-AM Austin, Texas
 Small: KUOO-FM Spirit Lake, Iowa

Personalities of the Year by Market Size
 Major: J.P. McCarthy, WJR-AM Detroit, Mich.
 Large: Coyote Calhoun, WAMZ-FM Louisville, Ky.
 Medium: Bobby Byrd, WUSY-FM Chattanooga, Tenn.
 Small: Jeffrey Steffen, KEXL-FM Norfolk, Neb.

Stations of the Year by Format
 AC/EZ: WSPT-FM Stevens Point, Wis.
 Big Band/Nostalgia: WPEN-AM Philadelphia, Pa.
 CHR: WXKS-FM Medford, Mass. 
 Classical: KING-FM Seattle, Wash.
 Country: KSSN-FM Little Rock, Ark.
 Jazz: KIFM San Diego, Calif. 
 News/Talk/Sports: KRLD-AM Dallas, Texas
 Religious/Gospel: WVEL-AM Peoria, Ill.
 Rock: KQRS-AM/FM Minneapolis, Minn.
 Spanish: KBNA-AM/FM El Paso, Texas 
 Urban/R&B: WROU-FM Dayton, Ohio

Marconi Radio Awards for 1993

Legendary Station
 WHO-AM Des Moines, Iowa

Network/Syndicated Personality of the Year
 Charles Osgood, CBS Radio Networks

Stations of the Year by Market Size
 Major: WGN-AM Chicago, Ill.
 Large: WCKY-AM Cincinnati, Ohio
 Medium: WHO-AM Des Moines, Iowa
 Small: KWOX-FM Woodward, Okla.

Personalities of the Year by Market Size
 Major: Dick Purtan, WKQI-FM Detroit, Mich.
 Large: Bob Kevoian and Tom Griswold, WFBQ-FM Indianapolis, Ind.
 Medium: Jim Zabel, WHO-AM Des Moines, Iowa
 Small: Max McCartney, WBIZ-FM Eau Claire, Wis. and Tony "Wradio" Wright, KWOX-FM Woodward, Okla.

Stations of the Year by Format
 AC/EZ: WHAS-AM Louisville, Ky.
 AOR/Classic Rock: WXRT-FM Chicago, Ill.
 Big Band/Nostalgia: WOKY-AM Milwaukee, Wis.
 Black/Urban: WHRK-FM Memphis, Tenn. and WRKS-FM, New York, N.Y.
 CHR/Top 40: KIIS-AM/FM Los Angeles, Calif.
 Classical: KLEF-FM Anchorage, Alaska
 Country: WWWW-AM/FM Detroit, Mich.
 Jazz/New Age KINK-AM/FM Portland, Ore., KSDS-FM San Diego, Calif. and WQCD-FM New York, N.Y.
 MOR: WMT-AM Cedar Rapids, Iowa
 Oldies: WCBS-FM New York, N.Y.
 News/Talk: WGN-AM Chicago, Ill.
 Religious/Gospel: WAVA-FM Arlington, Va.
 Spanish Language: KGBT-AM Harlingen, Texas

Marconi Radio Awards for 1992

Legendary Station
 WCCO-AM Minneapolis, Minn.

Network/Syndicated Personality of the Year
 Rush Limbaugh, EFM Media Management

Stations of the Year by Market Size
 Major: KGO-AM San Francisco, Calif.
 Large: WLW-AM Cincinnati, Ohio
 Medium: WMT-AM Cedar Rapids, Iowa
 Small: KFGO Fargo, N.D.

Personalities of the Year by Market Size
 Major: Don Imus, WFAN-AM New York, N.Y.
 Large: Gerry House, WSIX-FM Nashville, Tenn.
 Medium: Van and Connie, WHO-AM Des Moines, Iowa
 Small: Wynne Speece, WNAX-AM Yankton, S.D.

Stations of the Year by Format
 AC/EZ: WSB-FM, Atlanta, Ga.
 AOR/Classic Rock: KSHE-FM St. Louis, Mo.
 Big Band/Nostalgia: WPEN-AM Philadelphia, Pa.
 Black/Urban: WVEE-FM Atlanta, Ga.
 CHR/Top 40: WBBM-FM Chicago, Ill.
 Classical: KDFC-AM/FM San Francisco, Calif.
 Country: WSIX-FM Nashville, Tenn.
 Jazz/New Age: KIFM San Diego, Calif.
 MOR: WCCO-AM Minneapolis, Minn.
 News/Talk: KGO-AM San Francisco, Calif.
 Oldies: KOOL-FM Phoenix, Ariz.
 Religious/Gospel: KNOM-AM, Nome, Alaska
 Spanish Language: KWKW-AM Los Angeles, Calif.

Marconi Radio Awards for 1991

Legendary Station
 KMOX-AM St. Louis, Mo.

Network/Syndicated Personality of the Year
 Paul Harvey, ABC Radio Networks

Stations of the Year by Market Size
 Major: WCCO-AM Minneapolis, Minn.
 Large: WHAS-AM Louisville, Ky.
 Medium: WHO-AM Des Moines, Iowa
 Small: KSPN-FM Aspen, Colo.

Personalities of the Year by Market Size
 Major: Mark and Brian, KLOS-FM Los Angeles, Calif.
 Large: Gary Burbank, WLW-AM Cincinnati, Ohio
 Medium: C.C. Ryder, KBFX-FM Anchorage, Alaska
 Small: Don Munson, WJBC-AM Bloomington, Ill.

Stations of the Year by Format
 AC/EZ: KOST-FM Los Angeles, Calif.
 AOR/Classic Rock: KLOS-FM Los Angeles, Calif.
 Big Band/Nostalgia: KFRC-AM San Francisco, Calif.
 Black/Urban: WRKS-FM New York, N.Y.
 CHR/Top 40: KIIS-AM/FM Los Angeles, Calif.
 Classical: WFMT-FM Chicago, Ill.
 Country: KNIX-FM Phoenix, Ariz.
 Jazz/New Age: WNUA-FM Chicago, Ill.
 MOR: WGN-AM Chicago, Ill.
 News/Talk: KABC-AM Los Angeles, Calif.
 Oldies: WCBS-FM New York, N.Y.
 Religious/Gospel: KAAY-AM Little Rock, Ark.
 Spanish Language: KCOR-AM San Antonio, Texas

Marconi Radio Awards for 1990

Legendary Station 
 WGN-AM Chicago, Ill.

Network/Syndicated Personality of the Year 
 Larry King, Mutual Broadcasting System

Stations of the Year by Market Size 
 Major: KMOX-AM St. Louis, Mo.
 Large: WTIC-AM Hartford, Conn.
 Medium: KSSN-FM Little Rock, Ark.
 Small: WAXX-FM Eau Claire, Wis.

Personalities of the Year by Market Size 
 Major: Don Imus, WFAN-AM New York, N.Y.
 Large: Gary Burbank, WLW-AM Cincinnati, Ohio
 Medium: Luther Massengill WDEF-AM/FM, Chattanooga, Tenn. 
 Small: Bobby Owen, KEAN-AM/FM Abilene, Texas

Stations of the Year by Format 
 AC/EZ: KOST-FM Los Angeles, Calif.
 AOR/Classic Rock: WLUP-FM Chicago, Ill.
 Big Band/Nostalgia: KFRC-AM San Francisco, Calif.
 Black/Urban: WVEE-FM Atlanta, Ga.
 CHR/Top 40: KIIS-FM Los Angeles, Calif.
 Classical: KING-FM Seattle, Wash.
 Country: KILT-FM Houston, Texas
 Jazz/New Age: WJZZ-FM Detroit, Mich.
 MOR Variety/Full Service: WGN-AM Chicago, Ill. 
 News/Talk: KABC-AM Los Angeles, Calif.
 Oldies: WCBS-FM New York, N.Y.
 Religious/Gospel: WAOK-AM Atlanta, Ga.
 Spanish Language: WAQI-AM Miami, Fla.

Marconi Radio Awards for 1989

Legendary Station 
 WLS-AM Chicago, Ill.

Network/Syndicated Personality of the Year 
 Paul Harvey, ABC Radio Networks

Stations of the Year by Market Size 
 Major: KNIX-AM/FM Phoenix, Ariz.
 Large: WIVK-AM/FM Knoxville, Tenn.
 Medium: WBBQ-AM/FM Augusta, Ga.
 Small: KBOZ-FM Bozeman, Mont.

Personalities of the Year by Market Size 
 Major: Ron Chapman, KVIL-AM/FM Dallas, Texas
 Large: Bob Steele, WTIC-AM Hartford, Conn.
 Medium: Mark Summers, WBBQ-AM/FM Augusta, Ga.
 Small: Billie Oakley, KMA-AM Shenandoah, Iowa

Stations of the Year by Format 
 AC/Soft Rock/Oldies: KVIL-AM/FM Dallas, Texas
 AOR/Classic Rock: WMMR-FM Philadelphia, Pa.
 Big Band/Nostalgia: KMPC-AM Los Angeles, Calif.
 Black/Urban: WVAZ-FM Chicago, Ill/
 CHR/Top 40: KPWR-FM Los Angeles, Calif.
 Classical: WQXR-FM New York, N.Y.
 Country: KNIX-AM/FM Phoenix, Ariz.
 EZ Listening/Beautiful Music: KABL-AM/FM San Francisco, Calif.
 Jazz/New Age: KTWV-FM Los Angeles, Calif.
 MOR/Variety: WGN-AM Chicago, Ill.
 News/Talk: KMOX-AM St. Louis, Mo.
 Religious/Gospel: KLTY-FM Dallas, Texas
 Spanish Language: WQBA-AM/FM Miami, Fla.

See also
Marconi Prize
List of radio awards

References

External links
Marconi Radio Awards at the NAB website

American radio awards
Marconi Radio Awards